Long John Silver's (formerly known as Long John Silver's Seafood Shoppes and sometimes abbreviated as LJS) is an American chain of fast-food restaurants that specializes in seafood. The brand's name is derived from the novel Treasure Island by Robert Louis Stevenson, in which the pirate Long John Silver is one of the main characters.

Formerly a division of Yum! Brands, the company was sold to a group of franchisees in September 2011 and is now 80% franchise-owned.

History
The first restaurant opened on August 18, 1969, in Lexington, Kentucky. The original location, on 301 Southland Drive, was previously the Cape Codder  seafood carry-out restaurant. The original Cape Codder concrete block building was redesigned by architect Druce Henn, who created the New England style of Long John Silver's early chain restaurants. That original location is now a styling salon.

Earlier restaurants were known for their Cape Cod style buildings, blue roofs with square cupolas, wood benches/tables, lobster pots, and ship's wheels. Later, more nautically themed decorations were added such as seats made to look like nautical flags.

The restaurant chain arrived in Singapore in 1983 and has had a continuous presence in the country ever since. It remains one of 30 countries outside of the United States to have Long John Silver's outlets.

Those early restaurants also featured separate entrance and exit doors, a corridor-like waiting line area, deep fryers with food heaters that were transparent so customers could view the food to be served, and wrought iron 'sword' door handles. These buildings had dock-like walkways, lined with pilings and thick ropes.

Newer restaurants retained the basic structural design and theme, but eliminated most of the interior features. Its parent company, Jerrico was taken private in 1989 through a highly leveraged management buyout, and one year later, the other restaurant concepts were divested to focus on Long John Silver's.

After struggling for the next several years under its heavy debt load, Jerrico Inc. filed for Chapter 11 bankruptcy in June 1998. In September 1999, A&W announced to acquire the chain out of bankruptcy. As a result Yorkshire Global Restaurants was formed.

In 2000, Yorkshire Global Restaurants agreed to test multi-branded locations with Louisville, Kentucky-based Tricon Global, owner of the KFC, Pizza Hut, and Taco Bell chains.

The parent company of Long John Silver's and A&W, Yorkshire was acquired by Tricon Global and Tricon was renamed Yum! Brands, Inc in May 2002. By January 2011, Yum! announced it was seeking a buyer for its Long John Silver's and A&W All-American Restaurants divisions, citing poor sales and a desire to shift its focus to international expansion.

In September 2011, Yum! announced the impending sale of Long John Silver's to LJS Partners – a group consisting of franchisees and other private investors.

In July 2013, the Center for Science in the Public Interest, a nutrition and health policy watchdog group, named Long John Silver's "Big Catch" meal the worst restaurant meal in America, noting that it contained 33 grams of trans fat, 19 grams of saturated fat, 1,320 calories, and almost 3,700 milligrams of sodium. The company announced that it had eliminated trans fats from its menu, by January 2014.

In March 2015, James O'Reilly, who had previously worked for KFC (another Yum! Brands holding), was appointed as the CEO. He stated that he expected the chain to maintain its 1,132 stores, refocus its marketing following negative press about the fat and sodium content of the menu, and looked to the possibility of future expansion.

On May 22, 2018, Long John Silver's announced the acquisition of 76 franchised restaurants, primarily owned and renovated by ServUS, located primarily in Indiana. On October 19, 2019, Warren W. Rosenthal, former president of Jerrico and developer of 1,350 Long John Silver's restaurants, died, aged 96.

On January 18, 2021, Long John Silver's announced Blain Shortreed to take over as CEO.

See also

 Arthur Treacher's
 Captain D's
 Fish and chips
 List of fish and chip restaurants
 List of seafood restaurants
 Popeyes

References

External links
 

Companies based in Louisville, Kentucky
Fast-food chains of the United States
Fast-food chains of Singapore
Fast-food franchises
Fast-food seafood restaurants
Restaurants established in 1969
American companies established in 1969
Seafood restaurants in the United States
Treasure Island
Fish and chip restaurants
1969 establishments in Kentucky
1999 mergers and acquisitions
2002 mergers and acquisitions
2011 mergers and acquisitions
Companies that filed for Chapter 11 bankruptcy in 1998
Yum! Brands